Ernest Ormsby Powell (19 January 1861 – 29 March 1928) was an English first-class cricketer. Powell was a right-handed batsman.

Life
Powell was educated at Charterhouse and King's College, Cambridge. He made his first-class debut for Surrey in 1882 against the Middlesex. During his debut match, Powell made a duck in Surrey's first innings but followed that up with his maiden half century, a score of 53 in Surrey's second innings. Powell played four matches for Surrey in the 1882 season, with his final first-class match for the county coming against Nottinghamshire at The Oval.

Powell made a single first-class appearance in 1883 for Cambridge University against the Marylebone Cricket Club. In 1884 Powell played his second and final first-class match for the University against the same opposition.

During the 1884 season Powell also made his debut for Hampshire against local rivals Sussex. From 1884 to 1885 Powell made eleven first-class appearances for Hampshire, with his final first-class appearance coming in 1885, the season in which they lost their first-class status until the 1894 County Championship, against Kent. In his eleven first-class matches for the county, Powell scored 759 runs at a batting average of 39.94, with four half centuries and one century which gave Powell his highest first-class score of 140.

Following the loss of Hampshire's first-class status, Powell continued to play for the county in non first-class matches up until 1889, when Hampshire played Surrey.

Powell also represented the Marylebone Cricket Club, making his debut for the club in 1888 against Oxford University. Powell played a further match, against Cambridge University, in 1888. Powell's final first-class match came in his third and final match for the club against Cambridge University in 1895. In his three matches, Powell scored 138 runs at an average of 27.60, with a single half century score of 89.

Powell additionally played a single first-class match for the Gentlemen of the South against the Players of the South in 1885.

He later became a teacher, and was Head Master of Stafford Grammar School from 1901 to 1924.

Powell died at Stafford, Staffordshire on 29 March 1928.

References

External links
Ernest Powell at Cricinfo
Ernest Powell at CricketArchive
Matches and detailed statistics for Ernest Powell
 Ernest Powell Collection at the Harry Ransom Center

1861 births
1928 deaths
English cricketers
Surrey cricketers
Cambridge University cricketers
Hampshire cricketers
Marylebone Cricket Club cricketers
Cricketers from Liverpool
People educated at Charterhouse School
Alumni of King's College, Cambridge
Gentlemen of the South cricketers